The Delia Group of Schools is an education organisation in Hong Kong founded in 1965 by American Mr. and Mrs. J. W. Edmonds. It is evolved from Delia Memorial School in Ashley Road, Tsim Sha Tsui.

Delia is the name of a Canadian Sister, Delia Tetreault, of Holy Mother Immaculate Mission, who has been sent to Guangdong province of China to do the missionary work in orphanages in the Far East.

Delia Group of Schools consists of three different sections: Delia Memorial School, Delia English Primary School and Kindergarten, and Delia School of Canada.

Delia Memorial Schools 
There are 4 branches of Delia Memorial Schools across Hong Kong. The education provided is based on the local Hong Kong secondary curriculum. With their motto "Harmony in Diversity", their schools bring students of different nationalities under the local education system. For many years, the schools have supported the integration of local ethnic minorities with the local Hong Kong community.

 Delia Memorial School (Broadway)
 Delia Memorial School (Glee Path)
 Delia Memorial School (Hip Wo)
 Delia Memorial School (Hip Wo No.2 College)

More information on the Schools 

Delia (Man Kiu) English Primary School, formerly known as Man Kiu Association No.2 Primary School, is a primary school in the phase III of Cheung On Estate on Tsing Yi Island
 Delia English Primary School and Kindergarten is in Mei Foo next to Broadway
 Delia School of Canada in Tai Koo Shing, Hong Kong Island, Hong Kong

External links

 Delia Memorial School (Broadway)
 Delia Memorial School (Glee Path)
 Delia Memorial School (Hip Wo)
 Delia Memorial School (Hip Wo No.2 College)

Delia history

 
Educational organisations based in Hong Kong